United Nations Security Council resolution 2509 was adopted in 2020.

Russia abstained from the vote.

See also
 List of United Nations Security Council Resolutions 2501 to 2600 (2019–2021)

References

External links
Text of the Resolution at undocs.org

 2509
February 2020 events